Paul Giambarba is an American graphic designer, cartoonist, writer and illustrator. He initiated Polaroid's corporate image development and product identity in 1958. Giambarba designed and produced hundreds of Polaroid packages and collateral material including consumer literature and How to Make Better Polaroid Instant Pictures, a trade book for Doubleday & Co. in his more than a quarter of a century for this client. Giambarba has also been a design consultant for Tonka Toys and Tonka Corporation, as well as other corporate clients. His work has been the subject of articles in Graphis (Zurich), Industrial Design, American Artist, Idea (Tokyo), Relax (Tokyo), Grafik (London), Brand eins (Hamburg) and Communication Arts.

In his capacity as a cartoonist and illustrator, Giambarba was a regular contributor to Sports Illustrated, This Week, True and Spy. He was a member of the San Francisco Society of Illustrators during the nine years he lived in Sonoma County, California. Giambarba is the author of 13 books, founded the Scrimshaw Press and CapeArts Magazine, and was, with his wife, Fran, a founding partner of Arts & Flowers, publisher of botanically accurate greeting cards from 1985 through 1996. Giambarba's work was introduced at the International Center of Photography in New York City on 18 December 2009, a collection of 15 film and 3 camera packages for the Paul Giambarba Edition of Polaroid cameras and film commissioned by Dr. Florian Kaps, founder and director of The Impossible Project of Vienna, Austria.

Honors and awards
Gold Medal, Art Directors Club of New York
Certificates of Merit, Art Directors Club of New York
Gold Medals, Art Directors Club of Boston
Certificates of Merit, Art Directors Club of Boston
Certificates of Excellence, American Institute of Graphic Arts Packaging 1972, 1974, 1976
Andy Awards, Advertising Club of New York
Hatch Awards, Advertising Club of Boston
Certificate of Excellence of Design, Industrial Design magazine Annual Design Review

References 

"The Branding of Polaroid: How we beat Eastman Kodak and its little yellow boxes in the marketplace despite a clunky product and an irrelevant corporate name. " blog - Polaroid's quest for a graphic design identity
"100 Years of Illustration" blog
Giambarba's caricatures

Living people
American graphic designers
American cartoonists
Polaroid Corporation
Year of birth missing (living people)